Malayattoor  is a village in Aluva thaluk . It is situated around 15 km (9 mi) north-east of Angamaly in Ernakulam District in the state of Kerala in South India. The name `Malayattoor' is an amalgamation of three small words. Mala (Mountain) Arr (River) Oore (Place). This is to say, Malayattoor is a meeting place of mountain, river, and land.

Location

Located 52 km from Kochi, the Malayatoor Kurishumdy church  is situated atop the 609 m high Kurishumudy. The church is dedicated to St. Thomas, who is believed to have prayed at this shrine.  One of the most important Christian pilgrim centres in Kerala, this holy shrine attracts devotees in very large numbers not only from Kerala but also from the neighbouring states. This famous church is situated at Kurisumudi, a verdant hill in the Western Ghats girdled partially by the Periyar (river). The Church has a life-size statue of St. Thomas and the imprint of the feet of the Apostle on a rock. This shrine has now been accorded an international pilgrimage station.

History

Malayattoor a meeting place of mountain and river shot into prominence when she was supposedly blessed by the missionary work of St. Thomas the apostle of Jesus Christ. He is believed to have set foot at Kodungalloor, in AD 52 and founded the famous seven churches. On his way to Mylapore, he stopped at Malayattoor.

A hostile reception was given and his life was in danger. According to the Ramban Paattu, he was forced to flee to the top of the mountain and had spent days in the abode of God. According to local legends, In deep anguish and agony St. Thomas prayed to the Lord and upon touching the rock, blood sprang forth from it. In AD 52 he reached Malayattoor and selected the place for prayer and worship. His zeal for the Lord took him to Mylapore and later died a martyr's death there in AD 72.

Later, while on hunting the local people found a divine light emanating from the hard rock and upon examining the source they found a golden cross. They later discovered the footprints of the great saint and when this extra ordinary piece of news reached the plains, people began to flock the hills of Malayattoor.

Administration
Malayattoor is part of the Malayattoor-Neeleeswaram Panchayat (Local governing body) of Ernakulam district. .Malayattor is a part of Angamly Block .Malayattoor Forest Division, an important Forest Division under Central Forest Circle is headquartered here. The division was established in the year 1914, much before the Ernakulam District came into existence. The jurisdiction of this division covers the greater part of Ernakulam district including the urban-suburban area and adjoining forests unto boundary of Tamil Nadu.

People
Most people follow Catholic and Hindu beliefs. All the families are known by traditional family names.
Christian
	Catholics
	Pentecost – Assembly of God church Malayattoor

Medical centres
The Naturopathy Center is near Neeleeswaram at Palayi.St.Thomas Hospital is the major hospital in malayattoor

Festivals
Traditional festivals like Christmas and Onam are celebrated with great enthusiasm. Also, Christmas and New Year are celebrated with great pomp and show. Temples and churches celebrate their anniversaries popularly known as ulsavam/perunnal too with great fervour.

Education
 St. Thomas HSS Malayattoor
 St. Joseph Lp School malayattoor
 SNDP HSS Neeleeswaram
St.Mary LP School
Govt. LP School Malayattoor
New Man Academy Vimalagiri

Industries
This region is in the foothills of the western ghats. Spices like nutmeg and crops like tapioca, snake beans, areca nuts are also planted. Also rubber plantations are plenty in number. These spices are then exported and foreign revenue is thus generated. Also various herbs are available in the forests which are used for making ayurvedic medicines. Bamboo corporation, crusher units are the major industries operating in this area. Heavy vehicles like tippers and lorries are a common sight.

Nearest Railway Station
Angamaly for Kalady

Nearest airport
Cochin International Airport is about 18 kilometres from Malayattoor. The airport is well connected to all major airports in India and also connected to many foreign cities. Direct flights are available to Chennai, New Delhi, Mumbai, Bangalore and Kolkata.

Tourism
Athirapilly, Vazhachal are some 25 kilometres from this place. This attracts tourists from all over Kerala. Also the international shrine of Malayattoor welcomes a huge number of pilgrims. Kalady famous as the birthplace of Adi Shankaracharya is also popular among the tourists as it is some 10 kilometres from malayattoor. Mahogany Thottam is also a scenic place nearby. Abhayaranyam ( elephants are trained ) is also near and is a place of interest.

Pilgrimage

St. Thomas is believed to have landed in Kerala at Kodungallur (Cranganore) in AD 52.

AD 62 St Thomas returns to Malankara coast via Malayatur where he establishes ‘the half 
Church’ (a small Christian community dependent on the Church of Maliamkara).

Oral tradition says that while travelling through Malayattoor, faced with hostile natives, he fled to the hilltop where he is said to have remained in prayer and that he left his foot prints on one of the rocks. According to beliefs, during prayer, he touched a rock, upon which blood poured from it.
The chief festival is on the first Sunday after Easter. It is traditionally believed that St. Thomas used to make the Sign of the Cross on the rock, kiss it and pray at Kurisumudi. The story has it that a miraculous golden cross appeared at that particular spot. Pilgrims going up the hill to call out incessantly "Ponnum Kurishu Muthappo, Ponmala Kayattom", meaning "O Patriarch of the Golden Cross! Climb we shall, this golden hill!"
This Shrine was promoted to Archdiocesan status by Archbishop Mar Varkey Vithayathil on 4 September 1998. There is also a very ancient Church in the name of St Thomas (Estd. 900) at Malayattoor on the bank of Periyar River which serves as the parish Church at present. The annual festival of this church is known as 'Malayatoor Perunal' and it is celebrated in the months of March–April.
St. Thomas and Thamizakam
:The place of St. Thomas in the life of Tamil believers is something not to be overlooked. Anyone would be moved at the sight of an ardent but the simple faith of a Tamil pilgrim, a usual scene on the mountain. According to Rt. Rev. Dr. Soosa Pakiam the "Archbishop of Trivandrum, "Muthappan" the name by which the devotees invoke St. Thomas on the mountain, may have come from Tamizakam. A good number of pilgrims that visit Kurisumudy and seek Muthappan's blessings is from Tamil Nadu. The vital role played by the caravan route that existed between Kodungalloor and Madras from time immemorial has certainly contributed to this spiritual and cultural bond that exists between Kerala and Tamil Nadu. Later on the hunters went to the mountain for hunting.While they stayed in the night they saw a glittering sign of cross on the rock.Out of curiosity they struck there with their rude weapons. To their surprise blood gushed out. They ran to the valley and told the locals. They went to the mountain and while they prayed there they got many miracles. This is the humble beginning of Kurisumudy Pilgrimage.

Quarries

There are 25 stone quarries working near malayattooor hill. Some of the quarries working in so deep so that it will cause some major effect in the environment.

See also
Periyar
Malayattoor Ramakrishnan
Malayatoor Church
Malayattoor Carnival

References

Cities and towns in Ernakulam district